Rydal may refer to:

Places
Europe
 Rydal, Cumbria, a hamlet in the Lake District of England
 Rydal Mount, William Wordsworth's house in the Lake District
 Rydal Water, the lake upon which it is situated
 Rydal Penrhos, a private school in North Wales (formerly known as Rydal)
 Rydal, Sweden, a village in Mark Municipality, Sweden

United States
 Rydal, Georgia
 Rydal, Kansas
 Rydal, Pennsylvania, a Railway Station and suburb of Jenkintown

Australia
 Rydal, New South Wales
 Rydalmere, New South Wales, a suburb in Sydney
 Rydalmere railway station, in the above suburb